is a Japanese actress who is represented by the talent agency, Tom company.

Takano's husband is actor Yukiya Kitamura.

Filmography

TV series

Films

References

External links
Official profile 

Japanese actresses
Asadora lead actors
1979 births
Living people
People from Tokyo